The Nike Blazer was the third shoe released by Nike in 1973, originally developed as a basketball shoe.

History 
This sneaker was originally worn by NBA star George "The Iceman" Gervin. This introduced NBA fans to the Nike brand for the first time. The Beaverton, Oregon-based brand named the design “Blazer” after its regional NBA team, the Portland Trail Blazers. 

The original shoe was made out of three main components, with the upper portion made of leather, the tongue made of nylon, and the midsole of rubber. 

Other sneaker manufacturers were developing their own basketball sneakers and basketball stars to market them. Competing collaborations included Julius Erving with Converse and Walt Frazier with Puma. 

Nike, then known as Blue Ribbon Sports, took on its current name in 1971. Nevertheless, Nike was prepared to compete with the other industry giants and that could be attributed to the fact that the Nike Blazer possessed the technology for basketball shoes at the time. The Nike Blazer is still available in the sneaker market in low and mid-top.

Nike SB 
In 2005, skateboarder Lance Mountain released the Nike Blazer SB which was a design with new features such as a padded collar and insoles where Nike implemented their Zoom Air technology to accommodate skaters. 

The first Nike Blazer SB was released in May and carried a dark look with an all-black suede upper and a black midsole that was made thicker than what the original basketball shoe had. The swoosh and laces were a baroque brown which completed the first SB version of the Blazer. 

Although the Nike Blazer was created for the sport of basketball, it has become a part of the Nike SB (Skateboarding) sub-brand and is currently marketed towards the skateboarding community.

Collaborations 
The Nike Blazer has remained relevant in today's sneaker culture. This could be directly attributed to the numerous collaborations Nike has done with other clothing brands to create new Blazer colorways.

Nike Blazer x Off-White 
Off-White is an American luxury fashion brand founded in 2012.

In September 2017, Off-White and Nike collaborated on "The Ten" Nike Blazer. This shoe has a white upper, a white/tan mid-sole, and a black swoosh.

In September 2018, Nike teamed up with Off-White and Serena Williams to create the "Queen". This shoe has a wolf grey upper while the heel and tongue are white. Its mid-sole is pink and purple with a fade effect and a black swoosh.

In October 2018, Nike and Off-White teamed up to create two new Nike Blazers. The "All Hollows Eve" consists of a pale vanilla upper while the swoosh is in bright yellow-orange. The "Grim Reaper" consists of a 'clone black' upper with black mid-sole and upper toe, orange accents, and a white swoosh.

Nike Blazer x Sacai 
Sacai is a Japanese luxury brand founded in 1999.

In May 2019, the two brands collaborated on the "Black Blue" which features the most black upper while the eye-stays of the shoe are a university blue. It also features a university blue swoosh hidden behind a white swoosh.

In addition to the "Black Blue", Sacai and Nike released the "Maize Navy" colorway in May 2019. This would be their most abstract colorway thus far. It's made up of a yellow upper with a white toe. It also features a varsity red swoosh with a navy blue swoosh hidden behind it.

In October 2019, the two brands released the "White Grey" colorway of the Nike Blazer. This shoe is made up of an all white upper including the swoosh with small underlying wolf grey features such as the swoosh hidden behind the swoosh.

Also in October 2019, the "Black Grey" colorway was released. The shoe is made up of an all black leather upper featuring a black swoosh which is accented by a grey swoosh that is hidden behind. The toe is grey while the mid-sole and laces are white.

Overall, the four sneakers share an abstract look that suits Sacai's brand.

Nike Blazer x Stranger Things 
In June 2019, Netflix teamed up with Nike to create the "Hawkins High" colorway of the Nike Blazer which was inspired by the streaming series Stranger Things. The shoe was a part of a three-sneaker collection which included the Nike Cortez and Tailwind. This sneaker has a very retro look which suits the show's story line. It features an all white leather upper with a bright orange swoosh, white laces and mid-sole. The entire shoe is highlighted by green accents on the tongue and heel.

In July 2019, the two released another three-sneaker collection, this one featured the "OG Collection" Nike Blazer. This sneaker features all royal blue suede upper that is accented by a white leather swoosh that complements the white mid-sole and heel.

The most recent three-sneaker collection in August 2019 included the "Upside Down" Blazer. This sneaker is made up of a light tan mesh/canvas upper. it features a swoosh of the same color and material, making it hard to notice from afar. The shoe does feature a white mid-sole to match alongside the white laces.

Nike Blazer x Stussy 
In 2002, Nike and Stussy teamed up to create a unique sneaker that fit both brands' aesthetic feel. Two different colorways were released, one came in a navy blue with a pink Nike swoosh while the other was a wolf grey with an emerald green swoosh.

In 2008, the two companies released three new colorways of the Nike Blazer as a part of Stussy's Neighborhood Boneyard collection. This particular version of the Blazer featured a checkerboard on the upper portion of the shoe which came in blue, red and white versions.

Nike Blazer x Supreme 
In April 2006, Nike and Supreme teamed up to create and release three different colorways of the Nike Blazer SB as the Blazer was being transformed into a skateboarding shoe.

The "Varsity Red" features an all red leather upper with quilted stitching all around. The black laces are complemented by a swoosh that is made up of a silver snake like pattern. It also features a while mid-sole and white Nike logo on the heel.

The "Sail" colorways also features the quilted stitching on the upper but is made up of all white leather which is supplemented by white laces. The swoosh is made up of the same snake-like pattern. Overall, a very a much more subtle sneaker than the "Varsity Red".

The "Black" colorway just as the previous two sneakers, features the quilted stitching. The upper is made up of an all black leather upper with black shoelaces, while the mid-sole is white, giving the sneaker some contrast. The swoosh is made up of the same snake-like pattern.

References

Nike brands